Sergey Kubarev (born 17 June 1992) is a Belarusian former professional footballer. He is a son of Belarusian coach Oleg Kubarev.

References

External links
 
 Profile at Gomel website
 Profile at pressball.by

1992 births
Living people
Belarusian footballers
Association football midfielders
FC Gomel players
People from Zhodzina
Sportspeople from Minsk Region